List of headlands of Jamaica:
Half Moon Point
Morant Point
Palisadoes
Portland Point
South Negril Point

 
Headlands